Julie Jensen may refer to:

Julie Jensen (handballer) (born 1996), Danish handball player
Julie Brendengen Jensen (born 1990), Norwegian freestyle skier
Julie Kepp Jensen (born 2000), Danish swimmer
Julie Trustrup Jensen (born 1994), Danish footballer
Julie Jensen McDonald (1929–2013), American author
Murder of Julie Jensen, in 1996